James Harness (born April 6, 1934) is a former American football player who played for Baltimore Colts of the National Football League (NFL). He played college football at Mississippi State University.

References

1934 births
Living people
People from Dyersburg, Tennessee
Players of American football from Tennessee
American football defensive backs
Mississippi State Bulldogs football players
Baltimore Colts players